The 2037 bomber was a short-lived 1999 United States Air Force proposal to modernize and extend the service life of the U.S. bomber fleet and defer the introduction of a replacement "capability" (a strategic bomber or some future equivalent platform) until 2037. The plan was criticized by lawmakers and Pentagon officials, some of whom believed the existing fleet was in danger of becoming outmoded and overstretched. Amidst this controversy, Air Force officials revised this plan in 2001 to put forward an accelerated timeline for a new bomber. Accordingly a Next-Generation Bomber program was started with the goal of introducing a bomber in 2018, but this was canceled in 2009. This program was restarted as the Long Range Strike Bomber which resulted in the Northrop Grumman B-21 Raider, currently expected to enter service in 2026–2027.

B-2 production termination and looming bomber gap 
In 1998, a Congressional panel studied the merits of re-starting B-2 Spirit production, which had ended prematurely at 21 aircraft, far short of the originally planned 132 stealth bombers. The panel nonetheless endorsed ending production in favor of re-allocating resources towards B-2 upgrades or developing technology for a future new-build aircraft.

A few weeks later Congress ordered the Department of the Air Force to update its bomber roadmap, last reviewed in 1992. The resulting Long Range Bombers white paper released in March 1999 projected that a new "capability" would be needed to be fielded in the 2037 time frame. The paper estimated that due to mishap attrition and other factors other than useful service life, the number of B-1 Lancer would not meet Air Force requirements of 89 aircraft by 2018. For the B-2, the number of aircraft would slip below the service's requirements of 19 aircraft by 2027 due to a combination of mishaps and retirements due to end of service life. It predicted it would need to begin retiring B-1s at the end of their service life around 2038. For the B-52 Stratofortresses, the report estimated the service would be "unable to maintain our requirement of 62 aircraft by 2044." The Air Force's near-term strategic bombing needs could be met through service extensions and technology enhancements offering "a tenfold increase in bomber lethality" compared to 1992, according to the paper. According to that roadmap, a Mission Area Assessment would have to be completed by 2013 with production beginning in 2019.

The white paper did not identify the replacement "capability" as a bomber or any specific type of aircraft because, according to the report, "technological advances may lead us to a configuration or platform that in no way resembles today’s bomber aircraft."

The Department of the Air Force's contentment with the size and age of the bomber fleet disappointed some members of Congress who believed a new aircraft would be needed before 2037. The case for a hastened timeline was bolstered, some observers believed, by the DoD's 2001 Quadrennial Defense Review, which warned of increasing threats to U.S. power projection. The report said developments in adversary air defenses would threaten U.S. air power in future conflicts, and that access to enemy denied areas would be limited to stealth aircraft.

The Air Force conceded that a new bomber would be needed earlier when it updated its service life projections in November 2001. The new paper anticipated a capability gap due to a strategic shift from nuclear deterrence to conventional bombing, and the loss of B-52's low-level flying mission capability. The paper said the Air Force would need to begin its acquisition program in 2012–2015. The paper's recommendations were adopted as Air Force policy by Under Secretary of Defense for Acquisition and Sustainment Edward C. Aldridge Jr.

Legacy 
The Department of Defense continued to advocate for a later bomber introduction date. In its Nuclear Posture Review delivered in December 2001, the DOD claimed the Air Force was aiming to introduce its next bomber in the 2040s. Not until the 2006 Quadrennial Defense Review did the DoD formalize its intent to bring the project forward almost two decades. 

The Air Force next began the Next-Generation Bomber program, but this was suspended in 2009. Work resumed under the Long Range Strike Bomber program (LRSB), which resulted in the B-21 Raider.

Debates persist within the Air Force ranks about the 2037 bomber and the future of long-range strike. The Air Force's interest, or lack thereof, in a follow-on bomber to the LRSB has not been publicly divulged. In 2007, defense industry analyst Rebecca Grant called the bomber a "mythical beast" and lamented the Air Force's continued fixation on it.

See also
 Bomber gap

References

External links
 

Abandoned military projects of the United States
United States bomber aircraft
Strategic bombers